Claudio Andrés Jopia (born 11 January 1991) is a Chilean footballer who currently plays for Primera B de Chile club Magallanes as left back.

He began his football career at Deportes La Serena, professional club of his natal city, in where was promoted to the first team in January 2009 for play the Apertura Tournament of that year. Jopia made his debut in a 4–2 home win over Cobreloa, and in the same season, he formed part of one historic teams of La Serena that earned the Clausura Tournament semi-finals. Three seasons later, after a successful 2011 season under the guidance of the coach Miguel Ponce, being used as left back. On 24 March 2012, he received his first red card in a match against Unión Española.

References

External links
 Claudio Jopia at Football-Lineups
 
 

1991 births
Living people
People from La Serena
Chilean footballers
Chilean Primera División players
Deportes La Serena footballers
San Marcos de Arica footballers
San Luis de Quillota footballers
C.D. Huachipato footballers
Association football fullbacks